Eritrean National Cycling Team or ENCT (Tigrinya ሃገራዊት ጋንታ ብሽክለታ ኤርትራ):is the national cycling team represented Eritrea in Continental and International Cycling races. ENCT is a member of the African Cycling Confederation and the Union Cycliste Internationale

Organization 

Eritrean National Cycling Team is under the supervision of Eritrean Commission of Sport and Culture, The Eritrean Sport Federation and the Eritrean National Cycling federation Headquartered in Asmara.

Team Instructor: Samsom Solomon

References 

Eritrean cyclists